The southern beardless tyrannulet (Camptostoma obsoletum) is a small passerine bird in the tyrant flycatcher family. It breeds from Costa Rica through South America south to Paraguay, Bolivia, and Argentina.

Description

The head is dark brown or grey with an erectile crest and pale supercilium. The upperparts are grey-green becoming paler on the rump. The wings are brown with yellow feather-edging and two whitish, yellowish or cinnamon wing bars. The tail, which regularly is held cocked, is brown, the throat grey, the breast yellowish, and the abdomen yellow. The bill is black, but at least the base of the lower mandible is pale.

Subspecies from humid regions (e.g. the Amazon basin) are generally greener with pure yellow bellies, while subspecies of drier regions (e.g. eastern Brazil and western Ecuador) generally are greyer with duller bellies.  The subspecies C. o. venezuelae occurs only in Trinidad and Venezuela, and is well distinct in plumage tone.

The call is a loud whistled . In courtship, the crests are raised, the tail flicked, and an excited mixture of the  call and a churring  is given.

Sexes are similar, and this species always appears brighter, especially with regard to the wing bars, than the closely related northern beardless tyrannulet (C. imberbe), with which it was once considered conspecific. However, the two forms overlap without interbreeding in central Costa Rica.

Ecology
This species is found in light forests, cultivation, gardens with trees and dry cerrado savanna. Southern beardless tyrannulets are active birds, feeding in a vireo- or warbler-like fashion on insects, spiders and berries. Animal prey is either picked out of the air or off plants with a dedicated sally flight, or gleaned from vegetation. Fruit, e.g. from Alchornea glandulosa, are typically picked off when perched or during hovering flight. This species will readily mob small predators like the ferruginous pygmy owl (Glaucidium brasilianum). It tends to keep on its own except during the breeding season, and rarely joins mixed-species feeding flocks.

The domed nest is made of plant fibre or leaves with a side entrance. The nest is placed by a tree fork, usually near a wasp nest, which presumably provides some protection from predators. The typical clutch is two white eggs, which are marked with rufous and lilac mostly at the larger end. Incubation by the female is 14–15 days to hatching, with another 17 days to fledging.

As it ranges so widely, this bird is considered a species of least concern by the IUCN.

Notes

References
 de A. Gabriel, Vagner & Pizo, Marco A. (2005): Foraging behavior of tyrant flycatchers (Aves, Tyrannidae) in Brazil. Revista Brasileira de Zoologia 22(4): 1072–1077 [English with Portuguese abstract].  PDF fulltext
 ffrench, Richard; O'Neill, John Patton & Eckelberry, Don R. (1991): A guide to the birds of Trinidad and Tobago (2nd edition). Comstock Publishing, Ithaca, N.Y. 
 Hilty, Steven L. (2003): Birds of Venezuela. Christopher Helm, London. 
 Pascotto, Márcia Cristina (2006): Avifauna dispersora de sementes de Alchornea glandulosa (Euphorbiaceae) em uma área de mata ciliar no estado de São Paulo [Seed dispersal of Alchornea glandulosa (Euphorbiaceae) by birds in a gallery forest in São Paulo, southeastern Brazil.]. Revista Brasileira de Ornitologia 14 (3): 291–296 [Portuguese with English abstract]. PDF fulltext
 Ragusa-Netto, J. (2000): Raptors and "campo-cerrado" bird mixed flock led by Cypsnagra hirundinacea (Emberizidae: Thraupinae). Revista Brasileira de Biologia 60 (3): 461–467 [English with Portuguese abstract].  PDF fulltext
 Stiles, F. Gary & Skutch, Alexander Frank (1989): A guide to the birds of Costa Rica. Comistock, Ithaca. <

External links
Southern beardless tyrannulet photo gallery VIREO Photo-High Res

southern beardless tyrannulet
Birds of Costa Rica
Birds of Panama
Birds of South America
Birds of Trinidad and Tobago
southern beardless tyrannulet